Bouclier was the name ship of her class of a dozen destroyers built for the French Navy in the first decade of the 20th century.

Design and description
The Bouclier class were designed to a general specification and varied significantly from each other in various ways. Designed to displace , Bouclier was also the lightest ship of her class and displaced  at normal load. Their crew numbered 80–83 men.

Bouclier was powered by three Parsons direct-drive steam turbines, each driving one propeller shaft, using steam provided by four water-tube boilers. Bouclier was the fastest ship of her class, reaching  during her sea trials.

The primary armament of the Bouclier-class ships consisted of two  Modèle 1893 guns in single mounts, one each fore and aft of the superstructure, and four  Modèle 1902 guns distributed amidships. They were also fitted with two twin mounts for  torpedo tubes amidships.

Construction and career
Bouclier was ordered from Chantiers et Ateliers Augustin Normand and was launched from its Le Havre shipyard on 29 June 1911. The ship was completed later that year. On 27 June 1922, Bouclier collided with the battleship  at Toulon, France. Both ships suffered severe damage.

Bouclier was stricken on 15 February 1933.

References

Bibliography

 

Bouclier-class destroyers
Ships built in France
1911 ships
Maritime incidents in 1922